Sir Mawn Wilson (born June 4, 1973) is a former American football wide receiver in the National Football League and Arena Football League. He played college football at Syracuse. On March 25, 2002, Wilson re-signed with the Tampa Bay Storm.

Wilson played from 1997 to 2006 during his career with the Arizona Rattlers, Austin Wranglers, Buffalo Destroyers, Carolina Cobras, New York Dragons and Tampa Bay Storm. Wilson caught 139 passes for 1,501 yards and 18 receiving touchdowns in his career.

References

1973 births
Living people
American football wide receivers
Syracuse Orange football players
Denver Broncos players
Arizona Rattlers players
New England Patriots players
Tampa Bay Storm players
Buffalo Destroyers players
Carolina Cobras players
New York Dragons players
Austin Wranglers players